Bernard Ward, 1st Viscount Bangor (18 August 1719 – 20 May 1781), was an Irish politician and peer.

Background
He was the only surviving son of Michael Ward of Castle Ward, County Down, one of the justices of the Court of King's Bench, and his wife Anne Catharina Hamilton, daughter of James Hamilton of Bangor and Lady Sophia Mordaunt.

Life and career
Ward entered the Irish House of Commons in 1745, representing Down, the same constituency his father had represented, until 1770, when he was raised to the Peerage of Ireland as Baron Bangor, of Castle Ward, in the County of Down. In 1761, he was also elected for Killyleagh and in 1768 for Bangor, however, chose not to sit both times. Ward was further honoured in 1781, when he was created Viscount Bangor, of Castle Ward, in the County of Down.

Family
In December 1747, he married Lady Ann Magill, daughter of John Bligh, 1st Earl of Darnley, and his wife Theodosia Bligh, 10th Baroness Clifton (the widow of Robert Magill of Gill Hall), and had by her four sons and four daughters:
Nicholas Ward, 2nd Viscount Bangor (1750–1827)
John Ward, died young
Hon. Edward Ward (1753–1812)
Hon. Robert Ward (1754–1831)
Hon. Anna Catharine Ward
Hon. Sophia Ward
Hon. Amelia Ward, married Rev. Hugh Montgomery
Hon. Harriet Ward

Ward died, aged 61, at his seat Castle Ward. He was succeeded in his titles by his oldest son Nicholas, later placed under disability due to insanity. Both his third son, Edward, and fourth son, Robert, sat in the Parliament of Ireland.

Ward rebuilt Castle Ward in the early 1760s in a style which represented a compromise between the viscount's favoured classical style and his wife's favoured Gothic style. He also enlarged the estate by purchasing adjacent land and remodelled it in a more open style with a deer park.

References

1719 births
1781 deaths
Irish MPs 1727–1760
Irish MPs 1761–1768
Irish MPs 1769–1776
Members of the Irish House of Lords
Members of the Parliament of Ireland (pre-1801) for County Down constituencies
Peers of Ireland created by George III
People from County Down
Bernard
Bernhard